Mount Joan is a mountain located on Vancouver Island, British Columbia.  It is the highest of the peaks in the Beaufort Range that runs between Courtenay and Port Alberni in British Columbia.  The Beaufort Range is one of the Vancouver Island Ranges

References

External links

One-thousanders of British Columbia
Vancouver Island Ranges